The 2011–12 Canberra Cavalry season will be the second season for the team. As was the case for the previous season, the Cavalry will compete in the Australian Baseball League (ABL) with the other five foundation teams, and will again play its home games at Narrabundah Ballpark.

Offseason

Regular season

Standings

Record vs opponents

Game log 

|- bgcolor=#bbffbb
| 1
| 4 November
| 
| W 6–0
| Mike McGuire (1–0)
| Simon Morriss (0–1)
| 
| 1,685
| 1–0
| 
|- bgcolor=#ffbbbb
| 2
| 5 November (DH 1)
| 
| L 7–4
| Alex Maestri (1–0)
| Nathan Crawford (0–1)
| John Veitch (1)
| —
| 1–1
| 
|- bgcolor=#bbffbb
| 3
| 5 November (DH 2)
| 
| W 5–4
| Steven Kent (1–0)
| Chris Mowday (0–1)
| 
| 1,224
| 2–1
| 
|- bgcolor=#ffbbbb
| 4
| 6 November
| 
| L 9–6
| John Veitch (1–0)
| Brian Grening (0–1)
| Chris Mowday (1)
| 987
| 2–2
| 
|- bgcolor=#bbffbb
| 5
| 10 November
| @ 
| W 10–2
| Brian Grening (1–1)
| Dushan Ruzic (0–2)
| 
| 876
| 3–2
| 
|- bgcolor=#ffbbbb
| 6
| 11 November
| @ 
| L 10–7
| Darren Fidge (1–0)
| Hayden Beard (0–1)
| Ryan Beckman (1)
| 1,110
| 3–3
| 
|- bgcolor=#ffbbbb
| 7
| 12 November
| @ 
| L 3–2
| Paul Mildren (1–0)
| Tristan Crawford (0–1)
| Wayne Ough (1)
| 1,360
| 3–4
| 
|- bgcolor=#bbffbb
| 8
| 13 November
| @ 
| W 9–5
| Steven Kent (2–0)
| Jandy Sena (0–1)
| Mike McGuire (1)
| 706
| 4–4
| 
|-
| 9
| 24 November
| 
| –
| 
| 
| 
| 
| 
| 
|-
| 10
| 25 November
| 
| –
| 
| 
| 
| 
| 
| 
|-
| 11
| 26 November
| 
| –
| 
| 
| 
| 
| 
| 
|-
| 12
| 27 November
| 
| –
| 
| 
| 
| 
| 
| 
|-

|-
|-
| 13
| 2 December
| @ 
| –
| 
| 
| 
| 
| 
| 
|-
| 14
| 3 December
| @ 
| –
| 
| 
| 
| 
| 
| 
|-
| 15
| 4 December
| @ 
| –
| 
| 
| 
| 
| 
| 
|-
| 16
| 5 December
| @ 
| –
| 
| 
| 
| 
| 
| 
|-
| 17
| 8 December
| 
| –
| 
| 
| 
| 
| 
| 
|-
| 18
| 9 December (DH 1)
| 
| –
| 
| 
| 
| 
| 
| 
|-
| 19
| 9 December (DH 2)
| 
| –
| 
| 
| 
| 
| 
| 
|-
| 20
| 10 December
| 
| –
| 
| 
| 
| 
| 
| 
|-
| 21
| 11 December
| 
| –
| 
| 
| 
| 
| 
| 
|-
| 22
| 15 December
| @ 
| –
| 
| 
| 
| 
| 
| 
|-
| 23
| 16 December
| @ 
| –
| 
| 
| 
| 
| 
| 
|-
| 24
| 17 December
| @ 
| –
| 
| 
| 
| 
| 
| 
|-
| 25
| 18 December
| @ 
| –
| 
| 
| 
| 
| 
| 
|-
| 26
| 29 December
| @ 
| –
| 
| 
| 
| 
| 
| 
|-
| 27
| 30 December
| @ 
| –
| 
| 
| 
| 
| 
| 
|-
| 28
| 31 December (DH 1)
| @ 
| –
| 
| 
| 
| 
| 
| 
|-
| 29
| 31 December (DH 2)
| @ 
| –
| 
| 
| 
| 
| 
| 
|-

|-
| 30
| 1 January
| @ 
| –
| 
| 
| 
| 
| 
| 
|-
| 31
| 5 January
| 
| –
| 
| 
| 
| 
| 
| 
|-
| 32
| 6 January
| 
| –
| 
| 
| 
| 
| 
| 
|-
| 33
| 7 January (DH 1)
| 
| –
| 
| 
| 
| 
| 
| 
|-
| 34
| 7 January (DH 2)
| 
| –
| 
| 
| 
| 
| 
| 
|-
| 35
| 8 January
| 
| –
| 
| 
| 
| 
| 
| 
|-
| 36
| 12 January
| 
| –
| 
| 
| 
| 
| 
| 
|-
| 37
| 13 January
| 
| –
| 
| 
| 
| 
| 
| 
|-
| 38
| 14 January (DH 1)
| 
| –
| 
| 
| 
| 
| 
| 
|-
| 39
| 14 January (DH 2)
| 
| –
| 
| 
| 
| 
| 
| 
|-
| 40
| 15 January
| 
| –
| 
| 
| 
| 
| 
| 
|-
| 41
| 18 January
| @ 
| –
| 
| 
| 
| 
| 
| 
|-
| 42
| 19 January
| @ 
| –
| 
| 
| 
| 
| 
| 
|-
| 43
| 20 January
| @ 
| –
| 
| 
| 
| 
| 
| 
|-
| 44
| 21 January (DH 1)
| @ 
| –
| 
| 
| 
| 
| 
| 
|-
| 45
| 21 January (DH 2)
| @ 
| –
| 
| 
| 
| 
| 
| 
|-

Roster

References 

Canberra Cavalry
Canberra Cavalry